Copper indium gallium (di)selenide (CIGS) is a I-III-VI2 semiconductor material composed of copper, indium, gallium, and selenium. The material is a solid solution of copper indium selenide (often abbreviated "CIS") and copper gallium selenide. It has a chemical formula of CuIn1−xGaxSe2, where the value of x can vary from 0 (pure copper indium selenide) to 1 (pure copper gallium selenide). CIGS is a tetrahedrally bonded semiconductor, with the chalcopyrite crystal structure, and a bandgap varying continuously with x from about 1.0 eV (for copper indium selenide) to about 1.7 eV (for copper gallium selenide).

Structure

CIGS is a tetrahedrally bonded semiconductor, with the chalcopyrite crystal structure. Upon heating it transforms to the zincblende form and the transition temperature decreases from 1045 °C for x = 0 to 805 °C for x = 1.

Applications 

It is best known as the material for CIGS solar cells a thin-film technology used in the photovoltaic industry. In this role, CIGS has the advantage of being able to be deposited on flexible substrate materials, producing highly flexible, lightweight solar panels. Improvements in efficiency have made CIGS an established technology among alternative cell materials.

See also
Copper indium gallium selenide solar cells
CZTS
List of CIGS companies

References

Semiconductor materials
Copper(I) compounds
Indium compounds
Gallium compounds
Selenides
Renewable energy
Dichalcogenides